The 2022 Fanatec GT World Challenge Europe Sprint Cup is the tenth season of the GT World Challenge Europe Sprint Cup following on from the demise of the SRO Motorsports Group's FIA GT1 World Championship (an auto racing series for grand tourer cars), the second with the sponsorship of Fanatec. 

The season began on 30 April at Brands Hatch in Kent and will end on 18 September at Circuit Ricardo Tormo in Spain.

Calendar

Entry list

Race results

Championship standings
Scoring system
Championship points are awarded for the first ten positions in each race. The pole-sitter also receives one point and entries are required to complete 75% of the winning car's race distance in order to be classified and earn points. Individual drivers are required to participate for a minimum of 25 minutes in order to earn championship points in any race.

Drivers' championships

Overall

Notes
  – Drivers did not finish the race but were classified, as they completed more than 75% of the race distance.

Silver Cup

Pro-Am Cup

See also
 2022 British GT Championship
 2022 GT World Challenge Europe
 2022 GT World Challenge Europe Endurance Cup
 2022 GT World Challenge Asia
 2022 GT World Challenge America
 2022 GT World Challenge Australia
 2022 Intercontinental GT Challenge

Notes

References

External links 
 

GT World Challenge Europe Sprint Cup
2022 GT World Challenge Europe